Al-Salam Sport Club is an Iraqi football team based in Baghdad, that plays in Iraq Division Two.

History

In Premier League
Al-Salam team played in the Iraqi Premier League for the first time in the 1991–92 season, and the team made a good start, and managed to defeat major teams in the league, such as: Al-Zawraa, Al-Minaa, Al-Karkh, and others, and finally finished in twelfth place, collecting 33 points. Next season, the 1992–93 season, the team was not good enough, and with a strange decision, the team was excluded from the league, and was replaced by Karbalaa after 46 games, with Karbalaa adopting the results obtained by Al-Salam up to that point, and eventually relegated to the Iraq Division One.

Managerial history

  Nazar Ashraf (1989–1991)
  Nadhim Shaker (1992–1994)

Famous players
Nadhim Shaker 
Wamidh Munir 
Wasfi Jabbar 
Hassan Kamal 
Sadiq Mousa

Honours

Iraq Division One
Runners-up (1): 1990–91

References

External links
 Iraq Clubs- Foundation Dates

1988 establishments in Iraq
Association football clubs established in 1988
Football clubs in Baghdad
Sport in Baghdad